Albert or Al Taylor may refer to:

Albert Taylor (diver) (1882–1932), British Olympic diver
Albert Taylor (rower) (1911–1988), Canadian rower
Albert H. Taylor (1879–1961), American electrical engineer
Albert Davis Taylor (1883–1951), American landscape architect
Bert Leston Taylor (1866–1921), American columnist, humorist, poet, and author
Albert Pierce Taylor (1872–1931), American archivist and journalist
Albert Taylor (cricketer) (1894–1960), English cricketer
Albert R. Taylor (1846–1929), American educator
Albert Taylor (trade unionist) (1877–1947), British trade unionist and political activist
Al Taylor (actor) (1887–1951), American character actor
Al Taylor (politician), member of the New York State Assembly

See also
Bert Taylor (disambiguation)